A polar-ring galaxy is a type of galaxy in which an outer ring of gas and stars rotates over the poles of the galaxy. These polar rings are thought to form when two galaxies gravitationally interact with each other.  One possibility is that a material is tidally stripped from a passing galaxy to produce the polar ring seen in the polar-ring galaxy.  The other possibility is that a smaller galaxy collides orthogonally with the plane of rotation of the larger galaxy, with the smaller galaxy effectively forming the polar-ring structure.

The best-known polar-ring galaxies are S0s (lenticular galaxies), but from the physical point of view they are part of a wider category of galaxies, including several ellipticals.

The first four S0 galaxies that were identified as polar-ring galaxies were NGC 2685, NGC 4650A, A 0136 -0801,  and ESO 415 -G26.  While these galaxies have been extensively studied, many other polar-ring galaxies have since been identified. Polar-ring S0 galaxies may be found around 0.5% of all nearby lenticular galaxies, and it is possible that 5% of lenticular galaxies may have had polar rings at some point during their lifetimes.

The first polar-ring elliptical galaxies were identified in 1978. They were NGC 5128, NGC 5363, NGC 1947 and Cygnus A, while the polar-ring S0 galaxies NGC 2685 and NGC 4650A were at that time indicated as resulting from similar formation processes. Only some years later, when the first observations of the stellar and gas motion of polar-ring elliptical and S0 galaxies were possible with a better spectroscopic technology, the external origin of the gaseous rings was clarified. In addition to the best-known example, NGC 5128 (Cen A), a very regular polar ring elliptical, is NGC 5266

SPRC (Old Version)

The SPRC is the Sloan Polar-Ring Catalogue, an atlas of 157 polar-ring galaxies. It was put together with images from the Sloan Digital Sky Survey.There are four sections (A,B,C, and D). There are 6 galaxies in section A which are kinematically confirmed galaxies. There are 27 in section B, which are good candidates. In section C, there are 73 galaxies, which are possible candidates. And there are 51 galaxies in section D, which are related objects.

SPRC (New Version)

There is a revised version of the SPRC, with 275 candidates. There are 70 of the best candidates, 115 good candidates, 53 related objects, and 37 face-on rings.

Gallery

See also

References

External links
Astronomy Picture of the Day
 Polar Ring Galaxy NGC 4650A - May 10, 1999
 Polar Ring Galaxy NGC 2685 - 2007 February 16
 Polar Ring Galaxy NGC 660 - 2009 December 3
 Internet Voters Get Two Galaxies in One from Hubble
 X marks the spot in dark matter web - Polar ring galaxies offer first-hand evidence of the existence of the cosmic web, New Scientist, 29 February 2008

Galaxy morphological types